Enkleia is a genus of flowering plants belonging to the family Thymelaeaceae.

Its native range is Indo-China to New Guinea.

Species:

Enkleia malaccensis 
Enkleia paniculata 
Enkleia thorelii

References

Thymelaeaceae
Malvales genera